This is a list of Members of Parliament (MPs) elected to the House of Commons of the United Kingdom in the East Midlands region by constituencies for the Fifty-Fifth Parliament of the United Kingdom (2010 to present).

It includes both MPs elected at the 2010 general election, held on 6 May 2010, and those subsequently elected in by-elections.

Current composition

MPs

By-elections
2011 Leicester South by-election
2012 Corby by-election
2014 Newark by-election

See also
 2010 United Kingdom general election
 List of MPs elected in the 2010 United Kingdom general election
 List of MPs for constituencies in England 2010–2015
 :Category:UK MPs 2010–2015

References

England
East Midlands
MPs